Calappa gallus, common name rough box crab, or lumpy box crab, and Hawaiian name poki poki, is a benthic species of box crab in the family Calappidae.

References

External links
 

Calappoidea
Crustaceans of the Atlantic Ocean
Crustaceans of the Indian Ocean
Crustaceans of the Pacific Ocean
Taxa named by Johann Friedrich Wilhelm Herbst
Crustaceans described in 1803